Maronis is a monotypic moth genus of the family Erebidae. Its only species, Maronis rivosa, is found on Madagascar. Both the genus and species were first described by Saalmüller in 1891.

References

Calpinae
Monotypic moth genera